Hong Kong singer Kelly Chen has released 20 Cantonese Studio Albums, 10 Mandarin Studio Albums, 1 Japanese Studio Album, 1 extended play (EP), 2 Remix Albums, 8 Cantonese Greatest Hits Albums, 2 Mandarin Greatest Hits Albums, 2 Japanese Greatest Hits Albums, 1 Cantonese Collaborative Album, 4 Cantonese Video Albums, 5 Mandarin Video Albums, 5 Soundtrack Albums, 3 Mandarin Video Singles, 6 singles, and 25 promotional singles.
Chen made her musical debut in 1995 with her first soundtrack album, Whatever Will Be, Will Be (仙樂飄飄). Soon after, Chen released her first Cantonese album, Intoxicated Lover (醉迷情人), on December 15, 1995. This album drew inspiration from early 1990s pop music, while amalgamating trip hop, dance-pop and acoustic music.

Studio albums

Cantonese Studio Albums

Mandarin Studio Albums

Japanese Studio Albums

Singles
It is not common for Hong Kong singers to release Physical CD singles

Cantonese Singles

Mandarin Singles

Japanese Singles

Promotional Cantonese Singles

Promotional Mandarin Singles

References

External links
 Kelly Chen's official site

Discographies of Hong Kong artists
Pop music discographies
discography